The 107th Pennsylvania Volunteer Infantry was an infantry regiment that served in the Union Army during the American Civil War.

Service
The 107th Pennsylvania Infantry was organized at Harrisburg, Pennsylvania on February 20, 1862 and mustered in March 8, 1862 for three years service under the command of Colonel Thomas A. Zeigle.

The regiment was attached to Defenses of Washington, D.C., to April 1862. 1st Brigade, 2nd Division, Department of the Rappahannock, to June 1862. 1st Brigade, 2nd Division, III Corps, Army of Virginia, to September 1862. 1st Brigade, 2nd Division, I Corps, Army of the Potomac, to March 1864. 1st Brigade, 2nd Division, V Corps, Army of the Potomac, to June 1864. 1st Brigade, 3rd Division, V Corps, to September 1864. 2nd Brigade, 3rd Division, V Corps, to February 1865. 3rd Brigade, 3rd Division, V Corps, to July 1865.

The 107th Pennsylvania Infantry mustered out July 13, 1865.

Detailed service
Left Pennsylvania for Washington, D.C., March 9, 1862. Camp at Kendall Green, defenses of Washington, D.C., until April 2, 1862. Moved to Upton's Hill April 2; then to Cloud's Mills, Va., April 16, and duty there until May 11. Guard duty on the Orange & Alexandria Railroad from Manassas to Catlett's Station. Expedition to Front Royal to intercept Jackson May 28 – June 1. At Front Royal until June 10. At Catlett's Station, Weaversville, Warrenton, and Waterloo until August 5. Battle of Cedar Mountain August 9. Pope's Campaign in northern Virginia August 16 – September 2. Fords of the Rappahannock August 21–23. Rappahannock Station August 24–25. Thoroughfare Gap August 28. Second Battle of Bull Run August 30. Chantilly September 1. Maryland Campaign September 6–24. Battles of South Mountain September 14; Antietam September 16–17. Duty near Sharpsburg, Md., until October 28. Moved to Warrenton October 28 – November 7, then to Falmouth, Va., November 11–19. At Brook's Station until December 11. Battle of Fredericksburg December 12–15. Burnside's 2nd Campaign, "Mud March," January 20–24, 1863. At Falmouth and Belle Plains until April. Chancellorsville Campaign April 27 – May 6. Operations at Pollock's Mill Creek April 29 – May 2. Fitzhugh's Crossing April 29–30. Chancellorsville May 2–5. Gettysburg Campaign June 11 – July 24. Battle of Gettysburg July 1–3. Pursuit of Lee July 5–24. Duty along the Rappahannock until October. Bristoe Campaign October 9–22. Advance to line of the Rappahannock November 7–8. Mine Run Campaign November 26 – December 2. Demonstration on the Rapidan February 6–7, 1864. Reenlisted February 1864. (Veterans on furlough until May 16.) Duty on the Orange & Alexandria Railroad until May. Rapidan Campaign May 4 – June 12. Battles of the Wilderness May 5–7; Spotsylvania May 8–12; Spotsylvania Court House May 12–21; North Anna River May 23–26; Jericho Ford May 25. On line of the Pamunkey May 26–28. Totopotomoy May 28–31. Cold Harbor June 1–12. Bethesda Church June 1–3. White Oak Swamp June 13. Before Petersburg June 16–18. Siege of Petersburg June 16, 1864 to April 2, 1865. Weldon Railroad August 18–21, 1864. Reconnaissance toward Dinwiddie Court House September 15. Boydton Plank Road, Hatcher's Run, October 27–28. Warren's Raid to Hicksford December 7–12. Dabney's Mills, Hatcher's Run, February 5–7, 1865. Appomattox Campaign March 28 – April 9. Lewis Farm, near Gravelly Run, March 29. White Oak Road March 31. Five Forks April 1. Appomattox Court House April 9. Surrender of Lee and his army. Moved to Washington, D.C., May 1–12. Grand Review of the Armies May 23. Duty at Washington and Alexandria to July.

Casualties
The regiment lost a total of 251 men during service; 2 officers and 106 enlisted men killed or mortally wounded, 3 officers and 140 enlisted men died of disease.

Commanders
 Colonel Thomas A. Zeigle – died July 16, 1862 at Warrenton, Virginia
 Colonel Thomas Franklin McCoy
 Lieutenant Colonel James McThomson – commanded at the Battle of Gettysburg until wounded in action on July 1
 Major Henry J. Shaefer – commanded during the Bristoe Campaign
 Captain Emanuel D. Roath – commanded at the Battle of Gettysburg after Ltc McThomson was wounded

Notable members
 Sergeant John C. Delaney, Company I – Medal of Honor recipient for action at the Battle of Hatcher's Run

See also

 List of Pennsylvania Civil War Units
 Pennsylvania in the Civil War

References
 Dyer, Frederick H. A Compendium of the War of the Rebellion (Des Moines, IA:  Dyer Pub. Co.), 1908.
 Hough, Franklin B. History of Duryée's Brigade, During the Campaign in Virginia Under Gen. Pope, and in Maryland Under Gen. McClellan, in the Summer and Autumn of 1862 (Albany, NY: J. Munsell), 1864.
 In Memoriam: Henry Jackson Sheafer, Brevet Colonel U.S. Volunteers, Died at Harrisburg, Pa., March 29, 1900 (Philadelphia, PA: s.n.), 1900.
 Linn, George Wilds. An Echo of the Civil War: From Richmond to Appomattox (Malvern, PA: G. W. Linn), 1911.
 Thomas, James B. The Civil War Letters of First Lieutenant James B. Thomas, Adjutant, 107th Pennsylvania Volunteers (Baltimore, MD: Butternut and Blue), 1995. 
Attribution

External links
 107th Pennsylvania monument at Gettysburg

Military units and formations established in 1862
Military units and formations disestablished in 1865
Units and formations of the Union Army from Pennsylvania